Orma may refer to:

 Orma people
 Orma language
 Orma, Pella, a village in the municipality Almopia, northern Greece
 Orma Marble Palace, situated at Kothakulangara
 Orma Film Festival
 Orma, Tibet
 Orma (film), directed by K. K. Rajeev
 Ocean Racing Multihull Association
 Orma, common name of the butterfly Mopala orma